Cyprus High School is a public high school located at 8623 West 3000 South in Magna, Utah, United States. Cyprus High opened in 1918, and now has an enrollment of 1650 students. The principal of the school as of 2021 is Rob McDaniel.  The school's mascot is the Cyprus Pirate. In 2016, Cyprus added Brockbank Jr. High on the next street to the east as part of their extended campus.

Cyprus High belongs to the Granite School District.

Cyprus High School dates back to April 1918. The auditorium was added in 1973 and the science building in 1978. Due to the age of the main building, it was completely rebuilt in 1983.

The school has 63 classrooms and six relocatable classrooms.

Enrollment
Cyprus High School serves approximately 1,450 students in grades, 10–12. As of the 2016 school year, Cyprus has started enrolling 9th graders. The building of Cyprus isn't big enough to hold 4 grades, so as part of it, Brockbank Jr. High became a part of Cyprus. 7th and 8th graders that would've gone to Brockbank now go to Matheson Junior High School.

As of the 2020-2021 school year, 49.2% of the student body are White, 41.8% are Hispanic, 2.2% are African American, 3.0% are Pacific Islander, 1.7% are Asian, and 1.3% are Native American.

Notable alumni
 Norm Bangerter - former Utah governor 
 Scott Eyre - Major League Baseball pitcher
 Willie Eyre - Major League Baseball pitcher
 Pete Harman - KFC co-founder 
 SheDaisy - country music group
 John A. Pearce - Utah Supreme Court justice

References

External links
Official Cyprus High website

Educational institutions established in 1918
Public high schools in Utah
Schools in Salt Lake County, Utah
1918 establishments in Utah